Gayme may refer to:

 Gayme Magazine, a NAMBLA publication
 Gaymes, a nickname for the Gay Games
 Maui Gayme (born 1983), Chilean alpine skier
 Mikael Gayme (born 1979), Chilean alpine skier

See also
 R v Gayme, a 1991 Canadian Supreme Court decision
 Gaymer, a gamer who identifies as gay
 Gayming Magazine, a British online LGBTQ video gaming magazine